Alexey Sergeevich Eybozhenko (6 February 1934 — 26 December 1980) was a Soviet film and theater actor. He both was born in and died in Moscow.

This actor is best known for his role in the mini-series For the Rest of His Life, a film about Commissioner Danilov. It was based on the novel by Vera Panova, Satellites.

Early life

Alexey Eybozhenko was born in Moscow and became an orphan, when he was 7 years old. His father was deceased in the Great Patriotic War, in the Battle of Kursk. And soon his mother died, supposedly because of her grief.

Career

In 1957, he graduated from the Mikhail Shchepkin Higher Theatre School. Soon after, he transferred to the Koltsov Drama Theatre in Voronezh. He worked there for two years, and then moved to Moscow again to work at the Taganka Theatre. In 1964, he was accepted into the Mayakovsky Theatre. Three years later, he moved to the Maly Theatre, where he 
served until his death and played more than 20 roles.

Death
Alexey Eybozhenko died of hypertension 26 December 1980. He was buried at the Vagankovo Cemetery at the 58th site, next to his father-in-law, Vladimir Kenigson.

Selected filmography
 A Simple Story as  secretary  (1960)
 The Third Half as  Lemeshko  (1962)
Silence    as  episode  (1963)
 On Thin Ice as Andrey Trapeznikov (1966)
 I Was Nineteen as   Sascha Ziganjuk  (1968)
 Seventeen Moments of Spring as   Husmann  (1973)
 For the Rest of His Life as  Commissar Danilov  (1975)
 Trust  as  Nikolai Krylenko  (1975)

References

External links

 «Любовь Яровая». Аудиозапись спектакля на сайте Малого театра

1934 births
1980 deaths
Soviet male film actors
Soviet male stage actors
Male actors from Moscow
Burials at Vagankovo Cemetery
20th-century Russian male actors